The Prague International Festival of Comedy (PIFCO) is the largest international comedy festival in the Czech Republic. Established in 2018, it takes place annually in Prague over ten days, typically running through the first ten days of November. Performances are held in venues throughout the city. 
The PIFCO follows the steps of the PRAHAha International Comedy Festival, which took place in 2016, hosting 53 artists both from the Czech Republic and abroad. The festival was a huge success, nevertheless it was only a one-time event.
The PIFCO plays host to a plethora of local and international artists; in 2018 the festival will list 29 shows, (including 4 free performances) by 50 artists.  Although it is mainly a vehicle for stand-up and cabaret acts, the festival has also included sketch shows, improvisational theatre, debates, musical shows and workshops.

2016 Edition 

The international festival was organized by the endowment fund “Nadační Fond Comedy in Prague,“ a nonprofit trust in accordance with Czech Law. Its mission was to provide a humorous, international, and multilingual cultural exchange where people from different countries, backgrounds & ages meet and connect through comedy.

The festival welcomed more than 4,500 guests in several venues around Prague, attracting both tourists and residents of Prague. Audience members were of all ages and nationalities, with a strong focus on comedy, travel, and other cultures.

57 comedians coming from 17 different countries were performing in three different languages (Czech, German, English). The headliners were Andrew Maxwell, Alfred Dorfer and Lars Reichow.

The festival director was Lynn Tourki, a small person loving witty humor and sarcasm.

Czech Shows

German Shows

English Shows

2018 Edition 
The Festival is currently being planned. More updates will be available very soon.

Awards
As of 2018, the PIFCO ends its run by recognizing the most outstanding show and performer with an award for his or her outstanding lifetime achievement to comedy.  
The award is presented to the best act as selected by a special committee and festival sponsors

See also 
Edinburgh Festival Fringe
Just for Laughs
Quatsch Comedy Club
Designblok

References

External links 
Official Prague International Festival of Comedy Facebook
Official Prague International Festival of Comedy Instagram
Official PRAHAha International Comedy Festival site

Comedy festivals in Europe
Festivals in Prague